Birke Bruck is a German film and television actress.

Selected filmography
 William Tell (1960)
 Die Rechnung – eiskalt serviert (1966)
 With Oak Leaves and Fig Leaf (1968)
 On the Reeperbahn at Half Past Midnight (1969)
  (1995–1998, TV series)
 The Hardship Test (1998)

References

External links

1938 births
Living people
German film actresses